Serendip may refer to:
 Serendip,  an Old Persian name for Sri Lanka
or Serandib, an Old Arabic  name for Sri Lanka 
 SERENDIP, a SETI program at UC Berkeley
 Serendip Sanctuary, a protected area for wildlife in Victoria, Australia
 The Three Princes of Serendip, an old Persian fairy tale

See also 
 Serendipity (disambiguation)

Names of Sri Lanka